Hohlfeld is a surname. Notable people with the surname include:

 Alexander Rudolf Hohlfeld (1865–1956), German-American university professor
 Brian Hohlfeld (born 1957), American screenwriter
 Vera Hohlfeld (born 1972), German Olympic athlete